Oradell is a grade-level commuter rail station for New Jersey Transit in the borough of Oradell, Bergen County, New Jersey. Located at the intersection of Oradell Avenue (County Route 80) and Maple Avenue, the station serves trains on the Pascack Valley Line.

History 
Service in Oradell began on March 4, 1870, when the Hackensack and New York Extension Railroad opened service from Anderson Street station in Hackensack to the station in Hillsdale. The station depot was rebuilt in 1890 when the station was part of the New Jersey and New York Railroad, which was part of the Erie Railroad. The borough of Oradell bought the station on November 23, 1966.

The station house has been listed in the state and federal registers of historic places since 1984 and is part of the Operating Passenger Railroad Stations Thematic Resource.

Station layout
The station has one track and one low-level side platform. Three permit parking lots area available, with 117, 86 and 20 spots, respectively. Parking is operated by the Borough of Oradell.

References

External links

Borough of Oradell
 Station and Station House from Oradell Avenue from Google Maps Street View

National Register of Historic Places in Bergen County, New Jersey
NJ Transit Rail Operations stations
Oradell, New Jersey
Queen Anne architecture in New Jersey
Railway stations on the National Register of Historic Places in New Jersey
Railway stations in Bergen County, New Jersey
New Jersey Register of Historic Places
Former Erie Railroad stations
Railway stations in the United States opened in 1870
1870 establishments in New Jersey